The Monrovia–Glendora Line was a route on the Pacific Electric Railway serving the San Gabriel Valley. It operated from 1902 to 1951, supporting nearby real estate development.

History
The route was established in 1902. Passenger service at Monrovia began on March 1, 1903. The extension to Glendora followed in December 1907.

The Los Angeles terminal was moved to the elevated viaduct at Main Street Station after February 11, 1917. A proposed  extension of the line from Glendora to Lone Hill was denied by the Railroad Commission of the State of California in March 1918, citing wartime conditions.

Special runs to Santa Anita Race Track were offered during race days beginning in 1934. Cars were rerouted over the new Aliso Street Bridge on July 18, 1943. The final cars ran over the line in the early hours of September 30, 1951 — the final passenger cars to operate over PE's Northern District.

Route
From the 6th and Main Terminal in Downtown Los Angeles, the Monrovia–Glendora Line ran on the Upland–San Bernardino Line to "Valley Junction" (near Marengo Street, west of Sota Street) where the San Bernardino Line continued east. From there, the dual tracks continued on private way, in a northeasterly direction, paralleling Soto Street on the west, crossing over Valley Boulevard and the Southern Pacific Railroad Mainline on a steel bridge and continuing northerly to reach Indian Village (in the vicinity of Soto Street and Multnomah Street). Here, a four track system began. A mile or so further north, the four tracks crossed over Mission Road on a concrete viaduct, and then continued northwesterly on private way between the dual roadways of Huntington Drive. 

At Sierra Vista (Main Street and Huntington Drive) the Alhambra–San Gabriel Line branched easterly from the four track section and proceeded on Main Street, while the Monrovia–Glendora Line continued north and then east still between dual roadways on Huntington Drive, to Oneonta Park (Huntington Drive and Fair Oaks Avenue). Here, the Pasadena Short Line turned north on Fair Oaks Avenue. The line then continued on a four track system as far as "El Molino" (El Molino Street) where the system returned to dual trackage. It continued northeasterly still between the dual roadways of Huntington Drive, passed Oak Knoll Avenue, (where the Oak Knoll Line proceeded north into Pasadena), and in a mile or so passed what is now known as Sierra Madre Boulevard (where the local Sierra Madre Line turned north) in San Marino. 

Proceeding east, the Monrovia–Glendora Line passed southerly of Santa Anita Racetrack and continued northeasterly on private way to St. Joseph Street in Arcadia. The line ran in the pavement of St. Joseph Street from Santa Anita across the Atchison, Topeka and Santa Fe Railway Mainline to 2nd Avenue. The Arcadia train station was the route's San Gabriel Valley transfer point for ATSF passenger trains. It then went on private way as far as Olive Avenue at Monterey Avenue in Monrovia. The line then continued in the pavement of Olive Avenue as far as Shamrock Avenue. From Shamrock Avenue, the dual tracks on private way, followed along Olive Avenue and Royal Oaks Avenue to Las Lomas Road where they then traversed open land to the San Gabriel River. The river was crossed on a two track bridge, which was later reduced to single track after 1938. The line then continued across open land into Azusa and entered city streets at 9th Street and Angelino Avenue. The dual tracks reduced to single track on private way at 9th Street and Pasadena Avenue. Thereafter, the line proceeded east, north of Foothill Boulevard on private way to its terminus in Glendora at Glendora Avenue.

Stations

References

Bibliography

Pacific Electric routes
San Gabriel Valley
History of Los Angeles County, California
Light rail in California
Arcadia, California
Azusa, California
Glendora, California
Monrovia, California
San Marino, California
1902 establishments in California
1951 disestablishments in California
Railway lines closed in 1951
Closed railway lines in the United States